, better known as just Cervantes, is a fictional character in the Soulcalibur series of fighting games. Created by Namco's Project Soul division, he first appeared in Soul Edge and its subsequent sequels, later appearing in various merchandise related to the series. He is one of only four characters to have appeared in each of the games.

Creation and conception 
As a character introduced in Soul Edge, Cervantes's weapon was initially a rapier, selected before other elements of the character and designed to be unique amongst the other weapons in the game. As development progressed, the development team felt that the weapon choice made the character seem too "gentlemanly" (although the concept would later be used for Raphael Sorel) and changed it to a pair of swords, which were expanded upon to be the first appearance of the series' recurring weapon, Soul Edge. His design and concept were built to revolve around them, starting with gender, then physical measurements and lastly background details. After his appearance and movement were fleshed out by a concept artist, his character was rendered as a 3D model by a design team that worked solely on him and then animated by a motion designer using motion capture to create his in-game movements. The inspiration for a pirate as the game's antagonist was derived from two other fictional pirates, Captain Hook and Long John Silver.

When developing his swords, many different styles were considered, including the concept of the swords appearing as wisps of spiritual energy. Elements of these designs were utilized in subsequent appearances of the Soul Edge weapon in later titles. When the character's design was modified to appear in Soulcalibur, one of the swords was changed to a pistol sword, with the curve on the weapon's blade emphasized in comparison to its counterpart.

Design
During development, several designs were considered for Cervantes, with the initial concept appearing as a clean-shaven man with long hair tied in a pony tail and a raised-collar coat. This and several subsequent designs were eventually rejected, however, as the development team felt they were either too reminiscent of nihilistic pirates or gentlemanly in appearance. Taking a different approach, they designed his appearance as a tall male with a trim mustache and white hair extending to the base of his neck. A blue coat with an extended tail covered his upper body, with thick gloves extending past his wrist and a large hat covers his head. White pants cover his lower legs, surrounded by leather armor on his upper thighs, and armor plating covering his lower legs and upper chest, with a neck scarf resting atop the breastplate. His design was intended to orient the viewer's eye towards his left, with his hat angled in the opposite direction.

When designing the character's appearance in Soulcalibur, several zombified designs were considered, with varying states of decay. As the series progressed his mustache was expanded into a growing beard, while his skin tone developed a purplish hue. His pupils were additionally negated, giving his appearance either solid white or red glowing eyes, depending on the game. His attire developed a more pronounced barbed appearance as well, with the gradual expansion of his breastplate, and the addition of a red loin cloth by Soulcalibur IV.

In contrast, his secondary character model has remained throughout the series. Originating as a full body suit of armor with faceplate, initial appearances incorporated a large cape and small metal face mask, initially intended to cover Cervantes' entire face. In Soulcalibur, large spikes were incorporated into the arms and legs of the armor, while the cape was adapted into a metal "tail" for the lower half. In Soulcalibur III an open-face helmet replaced the mask, while in Soulcalibur IV, elements of both were combined. While the purplish hue added to his skin was retained as the series progressed, his facial hair changed game by game, either appearing clean shaven or with a simple mustache, depending on the title.

In video games
Cervantes de Leon was a privateer who was sent on a mission by the King of Spain to loot in the name of Spain. Following a disastrous attack on an English warship that killed Philip, Cervantes forsook his allegiance to his king and became a pirate. Receiving an order from a wealthy merchant to find the cursed sword Soul Edge, Cervantes voyaged through the sea and eventually found the sword in the possession of an English dealer. However, the sword gradually corrupted him until his soul was devoured by it. Having murdered all of his crew, Cervantes boarded his ghost ship on a reign of terror for twenty years until he was defeated and killed by the combined efforts of Greek warrior Sophitia and Japanese ninja Taki.

However, Cervantes was accidentally resurrected without his memory by Nightmare because of the Soul Edge fragments lodged in his body. For the next three years, he decided to search for the cursed sword despite knowing that it had robbed him of his free will while slowly recovering his memories. Upon the shattering of Soul Edge, Cervantes began his quest on collecting the fragments of the cursed sword for four years which melded to form a weapon for him, attacking other ships that came close to his sea. When the presence of Soul Edge's other half vanished, Cervantes's body began to weaken as the fragments that sustained him crumbled. He was informed by a servant of Soul Edge, Tira, that a powerful entity was the one responsible, so Cervantes sought to defeat the entity and preserve his life. Eventually, Soul Edge summoned all pieces of itself back to it. Cervantes followed its trail, intending to wield the sword once it completed itself. Along the way, he devoured the soul of his illegitimate daughter, Ivy, but after the latter had survived thanks to her artificial soul, Ivy retaliated and defeated Cervantes, releasing all souls he had consumed, including hers. His body beaten and his mind shattered, Cervantes was swallowed by a dimensional rift opened by Soul Edge.

Seventeen years later, during the wake of the 17th century, people reported the presence of Cervantes' ship, voyaging through the sea; Cervantes had been released from the rift, now free from Soul Edge's control and at his height of power.

In the non-canonical Gauntlet storyline of Soulcalibur: Broken Destiny, Cervantes' soul was required as payment for Ivy to create a potion for character Hilde and her party to cure her father. Though they attempted to renegotiate, they were forced to find and take Cervantes' soul by force.

Gameplay
Cervantes utilizes his two swords in combat to execute a variety of moves that take advantage of both weapons, many of which involve impaling his enemy or firing the pistol from the short sword for a long-range attack. Perhaps his most recognizable move is the "Flying Dutchman", in which he crouches and delivers multiple stabs to the enemy's midsection with extreme speed. This attack has been featured in several games as one of his signature techniques.

Reception 
Since his introduction Cervantes has been well received, with his fighting style serving as an element to compare to for later characters in fighting games. In 1997, PSM included "a wickedly evil villain" among the three reasons why Soul Edge "is the best Namco fighting game ever." In a 2002 poll by Namco prior to the release of Soulcalibur II regarding their favorite character, he tied with Maxi for fourth place with 11% of the tally. UGO.com ranked Cervantes at seventh place in their "Top 11 SoulCalibur Fighters" article, describing him simply as "a big jerk" while praising him as one of the stronger characters in the series. IGN listed him third on their list of the top ten characters in the series, citing his offensive techniques as a large part of his appeal. They additionally named him one of their ten favorite sword-wielding characters in video games, describing him as combining two of their favorite elements-"big swords and pirates"-into a singular character, adding that his pistol weapon "makes him even more awesome." Den of Geek editor Harry Slater shared the sentiment, naming Cervantes the seventh best character in fighting games and adding that while the character had become overshadowed by others in the series, he was "a brute, plain and simple". In 2012, Complex ranked Cervantes as the 41st "Most Dominant Fighting Game Character", and in 2013 the 5th best character in the series, citing "the undeniable cool factor of controlling a ruthless pirate" and his ability to be a "menace both far away and near" in terms of gameplay.

References

Fantasy video game characters
Fictional assassins in video games
Fictional criminals in video games
Fictional mass murderers
Fictional pirates in video games
Fictional Spanish people in video games
Fictional sea pirates
Fictional swordfighters in video games
Fictional gunfighters in video games
Fictional musketeers and pistoleers
Fictional torturers
Ghost characters in video games
Male characters in video games
Male video game villains
Namco antagonists
Soulcalibur series characters
Video game bosses
Video game characters introduced in 1995
Video game characters who can teleport
Nobility characters in video games
Fictional marksmen and snipers